The Green Prince is a 2014 Israeli/UK/German documentary film directed by Nadav Schirman. It is based on the autobiography of Mosab Hassan Yousef, Son of Hamas: A Gripping Account of Terror, Betrayal, Political Intrigue, and Unthinkable Choices.

The movie received four awards: Best Documentary Award by the Israeli Film Academy (2014), Audience Award during the Moscow International Film Festival (2014), Best Documentary Award at the Sundance Film Festival (2014) and Best Documentary at the Bavarian Film Awards (2015).

Synopsis 
The film tells the story of Mosab, son of Hamas leader Sheikh Hassan Yousef, who for ten years was a spy for Israel's Shin Bet.
The documentary features largely interviews with Mosab Hassan Yousef and also with his operator Gonen Ben Yitzhak, with original footage from the events covered, mainly from the Second Intifada, interspersed during and between those interviews. It covers Israel's counter-terrorism efforts during that period.

Cast
 Mosab Hassan Yousef as himself
 Gonen Ben Itzhak as himself
 Sheikh Hassan Yousef as himself

References

External links
 
 
 Trailer

2014 films
2014 documentary films
2010s Arabic-language films
2010s Hebrew-language films
Documentary films about the Israeli–Palestinian conflict
Films scored by Max Richter
Films based on biographies
Films set in the 2000s
German documentary films
2010s English-language films
2014 multilingual films
German multilingual films
2010s German films